Almásmező is the Hungarian name for two communes in Romania:

 Poiana Mărului Commune, Braşov  County
 Bicaz-Chei Commune, Neamţ County